Revenge  is an American drama television series  created by Mike Kelley and starring Madeleine Stowe and Emily VanCamp, which debuted on September 21, 2011, on ABC. The plot is inspired by Alexandre Dumas' 1844 novel The Count of Monte Cristo. During its first season, it aired on Wednesdays at 10:00 pm (Eastern), and later aired on Sundays at 9:00 pm for seasons two through four.

The series was picked up for a full season by the ABC television network after garnering a 3.3 Nielsen rating in the 18–49 age advertising demographic for its pilot episode, and regularly winning its time slot against every other television network (CBS, Fox, The CW, and NBC) in the 18–34 demo. Madeleine Stowe was nominated for the 2012 Golden Globe Award for Outstanding Lead Actress in a TV Drama, while the series was nominated for Favorite New TV Drama at the 2012 People's Choice Awards. Revenge became ABC's highest-rated series in Wednesday’s 10 pm slot since Lost's 2006–2007 season and was the only new series in more than four years to replicate the 18–49 demo ratings success that Lost had in its time slot since leaving the air.

The series ended after four seasons on ABC, with the final episode airing on May 10, 2015. The series finale was watched by 4.80 million viewers. On August 4, 2015, ABC announced the possibility of a spin-off series. On November 6, 2019, it was announced that a sequel series with the same title was in the works at ABC, yet no sequel series was ultimately picked up.

Overview 

A young woman poses as a new resident returns to the affluent beachside town, the Hamptons, in order to seek revenge at the families that wronged her 20 years earlier, but in the midst of her plan, she uncovers secrets, lies, and affairs, and finds herself in multiple dangerous situations that could tear the beachside town apart.

Cast and characters 

Notes:

Development and production 
In January 2011, ABC ordered the script to pilot. In March 2011, actress Emily VanCamp was cast as the lead character, and shortly afterwards it was released that Ashley Madekwe was cast in the series. Madeleine Stowe and Henry Czerny joined the cast as well. Max Martini and Robbie Amell joined the cast respectively as Frank Stevens, a private investigator and Adam, a wealthy student, who is hoping to attend Yale. James Tupper replaced Marc Blucas in the role of Emily's father, after Blucas was forced to drop out due to his commitment on Necessary Roughness. Recurring Gossip Girl star Connor Paolo was cast as a series regular playing the character of Declan Porter. Former Nikita star Ashton Holmes landed a recurring role as Tyler Barrol, a Harvard classmate of Daniel Grayson. On April 22, 2013, it was announced that Mike Kelley was stepping down as the executive producer and showrunner after season two, current executive producer Sunil Nayar was expected to take over during the anticipated third season. On May 3, 2013, it was confirmed that Sunil Nayar would take the reins after signing a two-year deal with ABC Studios to remain as executive producer. On May 21, 2013, it was announced that Gretchen J. Berg and Aaron Harberts had inked a two-year deal with ABC Studios which would have them serve as executive producers on the third season alongside Sunil Nayar.

On May 13, 2011, ABC picked the project up to series. On May 17, 2011, ABC announced that the series would air on Wednesday nights at 10:00 pm Eastern/9:00 pm Central, beginning in the 2011 fall season. The pilot was screened early on ABC's website during a promotional tie-in with Amazon Kindle.

It was announced in spring 2014 that a Revenge graphic novel was in the works, published by Marvel Comics. It was released on September 3, 2014, and explored the origins of Emily Thorne.

Revenge was filmed on Stage 25 at the Manhattan Beach Studios. Filming of the series ended on April 11, 2015.

On April 29, 2015, ABC announced that Revenge would be cancelled after four seasons, with its final episode broadcast on May 10. On August 4, 2015, a possible spin-off series was announced.

Adaptations

Reception

Critical reception

 the series holds an approval rating of 69% on the review aggregation website Rotten Tomatoes. Metacritic, which uses a weighted average, assigned the series a score of 67 out of 100 based on 28 critics. Dorothy Rabinowitz of The Wall Street Journal praised the series, writing, "The arrival of one pure and unadulterated drama about a passion as old as man is something to celebrate. That's particularly true when that drama is as spellbinding in its satisfyingly gaudy way, as Revenge turns out to be", while awarding particular praise to Van Camp for a "beguiling and entirely chilling study in revenge lust". Writing for The New York Times, Alessandra Stanley compared the series favorably with Gossip Girl, concluding that it has "just enough campy suspense to be enjoyable". Episode 5 of the series received particular acclaim, with C. Orlando of TV Fanatic writing that "Revenge took things to a whole new level this week", and noting with reference to the set-up of David Clarke that "Victoria seems the only one with a conscience."

Yahoo! TV mentioned the series among the top television programs of 2011. The series also made the covers of Parade, Entertainment Weekly, and TV Guide, and was featured in Rolling Stone, Vanity Fair, Vogue, People, Us Weekly, Cosmopolitan, Seventeen, and Teen Vogue magazines.

On May 10, 2012, ABC announced that it had renewed Revenge for a second season. The Hollywood Reporter reported that it was one of the first series to get a "stamp of approval" from ABC Entertainment President Paul Lee, who called the show "sexy" and "sticky", telling critics in January, "You just want more of it."

Ratings 

The pilot episode scored 10.02 million viewers in live plus same day, winning the 10 pm hour time slot against CSI: Crime Scene Investigation and Law & Order: Special Victims Unit. Revenge reportedly was the highest-rated television series in the hour for ABC since Lost. On October 22, 2011, it was reported that Revenge regularly won its hour in the 18–34 and 18–49 age demographics ahead of CSI and Law & Order: Special Victims Unit.

After a nearly two-month hiatus beginning on February 29, 2012, Revenge returned on April 18, 2012, at number one in the Nielsen ratings and won its time slot against every other television network with a first-place finish among Total Viewers, Adults 18–49 and Adults 25–54. Revenge won over an original episode of NBC's Law & Order: Special Victims Unit in Total Viewers (+33%), Adults 18–49 (+53%) and Adults 25–54 (+45%) and generated big year-to-year time-period gains in Total Viewers (+81%), Adults 18–49 (+35%) and Adults 25–54 (+38%), rising over first-run programming on the same night last year. The April 18, 2012, episode attracted ABC’s largest audience to the hour since the middle of February sweeps on February 15, 2012.

Revenge premiered strongly during its second season, with a 3.2 adults 18–49 rating. However, as the season went on, due to negative feedback on the storyline, as well as the scheduling of episodes against Golden Globe Awards, NFC Championship Game, and the Grammy Awards, Revenge hit lows of 2.0, 1.7, and 1.4 in the adults 18–49 rating, respectively, within three consecutive episodes. The ratings never recovered back to the levels of the fall 2012, and eventually ended the season with a 1.7 adults 18–49 rating.

Awards and nominations 
Revenge was nominated for Favorite New TV Drama at the 2012 People's Choice Awards. Madeleine Stowe received a Golden Globe nomination for Best Actress in a TV drama.

Soundtrack 

The music for Revenge is composed by iZLER. In 2013, Intrada Records released an album, Revenge (Original Television Soundtrack), featuring selections from his work for the first two seasons. From season three's "Dissolution" onwards, iZLER is credited as Fil Eisler. Angus and Julia Stone's "For You" is also heavily featured throughout the series.

Track listing

Broadcast 
In Australia, it debuted on Seven Network on February 13, 2012, and the second season began airing on February 4, 2013, the third season returning on February 3, 2014, and the fourth season returning on February 23, 2015.

In Canada, Revenge airs simultaneously on City.

In Ireland, it airs on RTÉ on Tuesdays at 10 pm. In New Zealand, the show airs on TVNZ.

In the United Kingdom, the series premiered on E4 on May 28, 2012, with season two returning on January 7, 2013, season three returning on January 6, 2014, and season four returning on January 5, 2015.

In Thailand, the series premiered on Channel 7 on March 28, 2015, with season two returning on July 5, 2015, season three returning on June 29, 2016, and season four returning on August 26, 2016.

Sequel series 
On November 6, 2019, it was announced that a sequel series with the same name was in the works at ABC. On June 29, 2020, ABC passed on the sequel series.

References

External links 
 Hamptons Exposed
 
 

 
2010s American drama television series
2010s American LGBT-related drama television series
2010s American mystery television series
2011 American television series debuts
2015 American television series endings
American Broadcasting Company original programming
American television soap operas
American thriller television series
English-language television shows
Mass media portrayals of the upper class
Psychological thriller television series
Television series about revenge
Serial drama television series
Television series about dysfunctional families
Television series by ABC Studios
Television shows filmed in Los Angeles
Television shows filmed in North Carolina
Television shows set in Long Island
Wrongful convictions in fiction
Television shows based on The Count of Monte Cristo